Union Hill is a former settlement in Nevada County, California,  from Grass Valley.

Gold mining is recorded as early as January 30, 1851. A number of mines yielded eighty dollars per ton at times. Sulfurets were said to yield 420 dollars per ton. First arrastres were in use, then a number of stamp mills.

The Union Hill School District, established in 1868, continues to operate in Grass Valley, though at a different location.

Beginning in 1876, travelers could reach Union Hill via the Nevada County Narrow Gauge Railroad. Its station was located on the Union Hill road, southeast of Grass Valley and northwest of Colfax.

The Union Hill mine was a good producer of gold for many years.

References

Former settlements in Nevada County, California
Former populated places in California